Badnian is a village of Rawalpindi District in the Punjab province of Pakistan. It is located at 33°48'0N 73°33'0E with an altitude of 786 metres (2585 feet).

References

Populated places in Rawalpindi District